Sebastian Cabot (Italian and , ; , Gaboto or Cabot;  1474 –  December 1557) was a Venetian explorer, likely born in the Venetian Republic and a Venetian citizen. He was the son of Venetian explorer John Cabot (Giovanni Caboto) and his Venetian wife Mattea.

After his father's death, Cabot conducted his own voyages of discovery, seeking the Northwest Passage through North America on behalf of England. He later sailed for Spain, traveling to South America, where he explored the Rio de la Plata and established two new forts.

Early life and education
Accounts differ as to Sebastian Cabot's place and date of birth.  The historian James Williamson reviewed the evidence for various given dates in the 1480s and concluded that Sebastian was born not later than 1484, the son of John Cabot, a Venetian citizen credited with Genoese or Gaetan origins by birth, and of Mattea Caboto, also Venetian. Late in life, Cabot himself told Englishman Richard Eden that he was born in Bristol, and that he travelled back to Venice with his parents at four years of age, returning again with his father, so that he was thought to be Venetian.  At another time, he told the Venetian ambassador at the court of Charles V, Gasparo Contarini (who noted it in his diary), that he was Venetian, educated in England. In 1515 Sebastian's friend Peter Martyr d'Anghiera wrote that Cabot was a Venetian by birth, but that his father (John Cabot) had taken him to England as a child.  His father had lived in Venice from 1461, as he received citizenship (which required 15 years' residency) in 1476. The Caboto family moved to England in 1495 if not before.

Sebastian, his elder brother Ludovico and his younger brother Santo were included by name with their father in the royal letters patent from King Henry VII of March 1496 authorizing their father's expeditions across the Atlantic. They are believed by some historians, including Rodney Skelton, still to have been minors since they were not mentioned in the 1498 patent their father also received. John Cabot sailed from Bristol on the small ship Matthew and reached the coast of a "New Found Land" on 24 June 1497. Historians have differed as to where Cabot landed, but two likely locations often suggested are Newfoundland and Nova Scotia.

1494 Cabot scouting expedition
According to Cartografía Marítima Hispana, Sebastian Cabot included a handwritten text in Latin on his famous map of North America (published in Antwerp, 1544) claiming to have discovered North America with his father in 1494, three years before his father's voyage. Sancho Gutierrez repeated this text in Castilian on his 1551 map. 
Placed next to the border of North America, the text reads:
This land was discovered by Johannes Caboto, venetian and Sebastian Caboto, his son, in the year of the birth of our Lord Jesus Christ MCCCCXCIV, 24th of June in the morning. They put to it the name 'prima terra vista' and [...] This big island was named Saint John, as it was discovered on Saint John holiday. People there wander wearing animal furs. They use bow and arrow to fight, javelins and darts and wooden batons and slings. This is a very sterile land, there are a lot of white bears and very big deers, big as horses, and many other animals. As well there are infinite fish: plaices, salmons, very long soles, 1 yard long  and many other varieties of fish. Most of them are called cod. And there are also black hawks, black as ravens, eagles, partridges and many other birds.

The year is stated as MCCCCXCIV (1494) in both hand-written versions. There cannot be confusion with the commonly accepted date for the Cabots' voyage, in 1497. Two suppositions can explain this. Sebastian Cabot and Sancho Gutiérrez may have changed the date in the middle of the sixteenth century. Intentional changes and inaccuracies were very common among geographers at the time, depending on the political interests of their sponsors. As Cabot was funded at the time of the map by Charles V, the Holy Roman Emperor and King of Spain, he may have been interested in showing that the first travel to North America was in 1494 and thus funded by Castilians or by Portuguese, and not by English or French. By the time Cabot was sponsored by Germany and Spain, both England and France had started claiming shares of the New World in competition with Spain and Portugal.

If Cabot and Gutiérrez stated the correct year, it would mean the Cabots sailed to North America on their own account, before proposing their services to England in 1496. No contemporaneous documentation for this has survived.

Early career with England and Spain
In 1504 Sebastian Cabot led an expedition from Bristol to the New World, using two ships: Jesus of Bristol and  Gabriel of Bristol. These were mastered by Richard Savery and Philip Ketyner, respectively, and fitted out by Robert Thorne and Hugh Elyot. They brought back a certain amount of salted fish, which suggests the voyage was at least partly commercial and that other expeditions may also have included fishing. Cabot was granted an annuity of £10 on 3 April 1505 by Henry VII for services "in and aboute the fyndynge of the new founde landes".

In 1508–09 Cabot led one of the first expeditions to find a North-West passage through North America. He is generally credited with gaining "the high latitudes," where he told of encountering fields of icebergs and reported an open passage of water, but was forced to turn back. Some later descriptions suggest that he may have reached as far as the entrance of Hudson Bay. According to Peter Martyr's 1516 account Sebastian then sailed south along the east coast of North America, passing the rich fisheries off the coast of Newfoundland, going on until he was 'almost in the latitude of Gibraltar' and 'almost the longitude of Cuba'. This would imply that he reached as far as the Chesapeake Bay, near what is now Washington, D.C.. Returning home 'he found the King dead, and his son cared little for such an enterprise'. This suggests Sebastian arrived back in England shortly after the death of Henry VII in April 1509 and the accession of Henry VIII, who did indeed show much less interest in the exploration of the New World than his father.

By 1512 Cabot was employed by Henry VIII as a cartographer, supplying the king with a map of Gascony and Guienne.   In the same year he accompanied the Marquess of Dorset's expedition to Spain, where he was made captain by Ferdinand V. Cabot believed that Spain was more interested in major exploration, but his hopes of getting Ferdinand's support were lost with the king's death. In the turmoil afterward, no plans would be made for new expeditions, and Cabot returned to England.

The scholar and translator/civil servant Richard Eden, who came to know Cabot towards the end of his life, ascribed to the explorer 'the governance' of a voyage of c.1516 under English flag. This has been accepted and elaborated by a number of English writers, particularly of the turn of the nineteenth century. Rodney Skelton, author of Cabot's entry in the Dictionary of Canadian Biography, connected Eden's text to a known expedition of 1517 which indeed aborted, but is not known to have involved Cabot; while the historian Alwyn Ruddock transferred Eden's story of the opposition to Cabot's plans of Thomas Spert, future master of the king's ship Mary Rose, to the explorer's voyage of 1508–9.

Cabot's effort's in 1521 to bring together and lead an English discovery voyage to North America are well attested.  He had the support of Henry VIII and Cardinal Wolsey, and some offers of backing in money and ships from both Bristol and London merchants.  But the Drapers Company expressed their distrust of Sebastian, and offered only limited funds.  The response of other livery companies is unknown.  The project was abandoned, and Cabot returned to Spain.

Marriages and family
Cabot married Joanna (later recorded as Juana in Spanish documents.) They had children before 1512, the year he entered Spanish service. That year, he returned to London to bring his wife and family to Seville. By 14 September 1514, his wife was dead. Among his children was a daughter Elizabeth. An unnamed daughter was recorded as dying in 1533.

In Spain Cabot married again, in 1523, to Catalina de Medrano, widow of the conquistador Pedro Barba. It is not known if the marriage produced offspring. But since the Spanish wills of both Catalina (1547) and Sebastian (1548) name nieces of Catalina as their heirs, it is unlikely that by the time of Catalina's death, the pair had children surviving from their marriage. Catalina died on 2 Sep 1547.

Service to Spain

Believing that King Ferdinand II of Aragon was giving more financial support to exploration than the English, Cabot moved to Spain from England in 1512. When King Ferdinand died in 1516 it ended a period of exploration and Cabot returned to England.

By 1522, he was once again working for Spain as a member of the Council of the Indies and holding the rank of Pilot-Major, where he supervised naval and navigator training, etc. Cabot secretly offered his services to Venice in communications with the Council of Ten. He promised to undertake to find the Northwest Passage to China for Venice if they would receive him.

Cabot was commissioned at the rank of captain general in Spain. On 4 March 1525, he was given command of a fleet that was to determine from astronomical observation the precise demarcation of the Treaty of Tordesillas, which defined the area of Spanish and Portuguese monopolies. He was also to convey settlers to the Molucca Islands in the Pacific, to strengthen Spanish claims in the spice islands. This voyage was officially noted as an expedition for the discovery of Tarshish, Ophir, Eastern Cathay, and Cipango (Japan). This expedition consisted of four ships with 250 men, and set sail from Sanlúcar de Barrameda on 3 April 1526.

By this time the survivors of Magellan's expedition had completed their circumnavigation of the world, finding it larger than previously known. The voyage had increased pressure on Spain and Portugal to define their territories, as old boundaries seemed superseded by new data. Cabot was directed to cross the Pacific twice and he might have accomplished a second circumnavigation of the world. When Cabot landed with his expedition in Brazil, however, he heard of the rumours of the great wealth of the Incan king and the nearly-successful invasion of Aleixo Garcia. He abandoned his charge and explored the interior of the Río de la Plata along the northern border of present-day Argentina.

Cabot had already earned the disapproval of his crew by stranding the fleet in the doldrums and running the flagship aground off Santa Catarina Island. His decision regarding the Río de la Plata led to open resistance from Martin Méndez (his lieutenant general), Miguel de Rodas (pilot of the Capitana), and Francisco de Rojas (the captain of one of the other vessels). He dealt with the mutiny by marooning these men and other officers on Santa Catarina Island, where they are believed to have died.

Cabot sailed into the wide Río de la Plata and spent five months exploring the estuary. He established a fort called San Salvador at the confluence of the Uruguay and the Río San Salvador. This was the first Spanish settlement in modern-day Uruguay.

Leaving the two larger ships there, he sailed up the Paraná River in the brigantine and a galley constructed at Santa Catarina. His party constructed a small fort called Santo or Espíritu Santo at the confluence of the Paraná and the Río Carcarañá. This was the first Spanish settlement in present-day Argentina; the town of Gaboto was later constructed nearby and named in his honour. Losing 18 men to an ambush, Cabot returned to San Salvador, passing Diego García's expedition as he went.

As a result of this encounter, Cabot sent one ship back to Spain.  The Trinidad sailed on 8 July 1528 with his reports, accusations against the mutineers, and requests for further aid. In the spring of 1529, he returned upriver to Espíritu Santo, which he discovered had been overwhelmed and burnt by the Indians during his absence. He recovered the cannon and returned to San Salvador.

At a council on 6 August 1529, he decided to return to Spain. Cabot sailed with García to São Vicente. Purchasing 50 slaves there, he traveled along the coast of Brazil before heading across the Atlantic, reaching Seville on 22 July 1530, with one ship and 24 men.

He was arraigned on charges from the Crown, by Rojas, and by the families of Rodas and Méndez. He was condemned by the Council of the Indies on charges of disobedience, misadministration, and causing the death of officers under his command. He was sentenced to heavy fines and a two-year banishment to Oran in North Africa.

During these proceedings, however, the Emperor of Spain had been absent in Germany. Upon his return, Cabot presented him with descriptions of the region. Although no pardon is recorded and the fines were still paid, it is known that Cabot never went into exile.  He retained the post of pilot-major of Spain until 1547. Without losing either title or pension, he left Spain and returned to England.

Later years
In the year 1553, Cabot discussed a voyage to China and re-joining the service of Charles V with Jean Scheyfve, the king's ambassador in England. In the meantime Cabot had reopened negotiations with Venice, but he reached no agreement with that republic. After this he acted as an advisor for "English ventures for discovery of the Northwest Passage. He became governor of the Muscovy Company in 1553 and, along with John Dee, helped it prepare for an expedition led by Sir Hugh Willoughby and Richard Chancellor. He was made life-governor of the "Company of Merchant Adventurers", and equipped the 1557 expedition of Steven Borough. By February 1557, he was replaced as governor of the Muscovy Company. He was recorded as receiving a quarterly pension, which he was first paid in person. Someone picked up for him in June and September 1557, and no one was paid in December, suggesting that he had died by then.

Reputation
From the later sixteenth century until the mid-nineteenth century, historians believed that Sebastian Cabot, rather than his father John, led the famous Bristol expeditions of the later 1490s, which resulted in the European discovery, or rediscovery after the Vikings, of North America. This error seems to have been attributed to Sebastian's accounts in his old age. The result was that the influential geographical writer Richard Hakluyt represented his father John Cabot as a figurehead for the expeditions and suggested that Sebastian actually led them. When new archival finds in the nineteenth century demonstrated that this was not the case, Sebastian was denigrated, disparaged by Henry Harrisse, in particular, as a man who willfully appropriated his father's achievements and represented them as his own. Because of this, Sebastian received much less attention in the twentieth century. But other documentary finds, as summarized above, have demonstrated that he did lead some exploratory voyages from Bristol in the first decade of the sixteenth century.

A. C. H. Smith wrote a biographical novel about him, Sebastian The Navigator (Weidenfeld & Nicolson, 1985).

Honors
 A 19th-century bronze relief of Cabot and Henry VII by William Theed is located in the British Houses of Parliament.

Sources
 Evan T. Jones and Margaret M. Condon, Cabot and Bristol's Age of Discovery: The Bristol Discovery Voyages 1480-1508 (University of Bristol, Nov. 2016). This short book provides an up-to-date account of the voyages, based on the research of the "Cabot Project", aimed at a general audience. Chapter 7 'Bristol and the 'New Found Land': 1499-1508 voyages', pp. 57-70, includes a discussion of Sebastian's involvement in Bristol exploration at this time.
Appleton's American Biography, Virtual Museum of History
"Sebastian Cabot", Encyclopædia Britannica
R. A. Skelton, "Cabot, Sebastian," in Dictionary of Canadian Biography, vol. 1, University of Toronto/Université Laval, 2003-
Heather Dalton, Merchants and Explorers: Roger Barlow, Sebastian Cabot, & Networks of Atlantic Exchange 1500-1560 (Oxford, 2016) 
José Toribio Medina, El Veneciano Sebastián Caboto al servicio de España (2 vols, Santiago de Chile, 1908) (In Spanish).  The best source for the River Plate expedition and the subsequent proceedings against Sebastian.

References

External links
Sources: "First Letters Patent granted by Henry VII to John Cabot [and sons], 5 March 1496", The Smugglers' City, History Dept., University of Bristol

Explorers from the Republic of Venice
16th-century Italian cartographers
Explorers of Canada
Explorers of Argentina
Italian explorers of North America
Italian explorers of South America
1470s births
1550s deaths
Explorers from Bristol
16th century in the Viceroyalty of Peru